Lieutenant-General Herbert William Lumsden,  & Bar, MC (8 April 1897 – 6 January 1945) was a senior British Army officer who fought in both the First and Second World Wars. He commanded the 1st Armoured Division in the Western Desert campaign, and later commanded the X Corps at the Second Battle of El Alamein, before being relieved by his superior, Lieutenant-General Bernard Montgomery.

He was killed in action by the Japanese in early 1945, becoming the most senior combat casualty of the British Army of the Second World War.

Early life and military career
Herbert Lumsden was born in Santiago, Chile on 8 April 1897, the son of John and Anna Lumsden, née Dimalow. He was sent to England and was educated at The Leys School. At the outbreak of the First World War, in August 1914, he was only 17 years old. He served in the ranks with the Territorial Force (TF) for ten months before passing into the Royal Military Academy, Woolwich, from where he was commissioned into the Royal Horse Artillery on 13 August 1916. On 26 July 1918 Lumsden was awarded the Military Cross. The citation read:

Between wars
On 19 April 1923, Lumsden married Alice Mary Roddick in Northaw. They had two sons, Jack and Peter. Lumsden continued to serve in the Royal Artillery until 24 June 1925, when he transferred to the cavalry regiment 12th Royal Lancers. In August, he was promoted from lieutenant to captain after almost eight years in the former rank. He was an ardent horseman, despite his 6 ft height, and participated in a number of Grand Nationals. In 1926, he won the Grand Military Gold Cup at Sandown riding Foxtrot.

In 1929, Lumsden attended and passed the Staff College, Camberley course. Promoted to major in 1931, he held staff appointments in the cavalry for the next four years, being GSO3 of Aldershot Command and then brigade major of the 1st Cavalry Brigade. After a period of not being employed he became GSO2 at the Staff College, Camberley before being given command, in 1938, of his old regiment, the 12th Royal Lancers in succession to Colonel Richard McCreery. He was still in command of the regiment, now converted to armoured cars, at the outbreak of the Second World War.

Second World War

Lumsden was widely praised for his command of his regiment during the retreat to Dunkirk in 1940 as part of the British Expeditionary Force (BEF). His regiment, the reconnaissance regiment of BEF General Headquarters (GHQ), was the first unit to cross the border from France into Belgium, occurring at roughly 13:00 on 10 May, the day of the German assault in the West. Amongst other actions he held off German attacks on Bernard Montgomery's 3rd Division's exposed left flank for which he was awarded the Distinguished Service Order (DSO) but Montgomery felt upstaged by the lower ranked Lumsden who had acted without orders and the relationship between the two men deteriorated.

After returning to the United Kingdom Lumsden was promoted and commanded a tank brigade before being appointed General Officer Commanding (GOC) of the 6th Armoured Division in Home Forces in October 1941, taking over from Major-General John Crocker.

His period in command was very brief, however, as on 5 November Lumsden was given command of the 1st Armoured Division, which was then just beginning to arrive in Egypt. It was in this role that he first saw service in the North African campaign. A forceful personality, he was wounded twice in 1942 (having to hand over his command to Frank Messervy from January to March), received a Bar to his DSO and on his return to service and the 1st Armoured Division, survived Lieutenant-General Bernard Montgomery's cull of Eighth Army commanders. Montgomery had been keen to sack Lumsden whom he still resented following the incident at Dunkirk but he was overruled by his Commander-in-Chief General Sir Harold Alexander.

Lumsden was appointed commander of X Corps for the Second Battle of El Alamein upon the recommendation of Lieutenant-General Brian Horrocks, who turned the command down in his favour.

The Miteiriya Ridge controversy
During the night of 24/25 October 1942, after the Second Battle of El Alamein had begun, the British assault of infantry and engineers over the Miteiriya Ridge during the Second Battle of El Alamein failed. Despite having agreed to Montgomery's battle plan, Lumsden believed it was impossible for his X Corps armour to fight its way into the open without incurring appalling casualties from uncleared minefields and anti-tank fire. He wanted to pull his tanks back and send them into battle once the assault of infantry and engineers had taken place as originally planned.

In the early hours of 25 October, Lumsden and Montgomery argued fiercely. The relationship between the two men was worse than ever, and Lumsden demanded that his armour should be pulled back whilst Montgomery insisted the attack continue. Lumsden asked one of his tank commanders, Major-General Alexander Gatehouse, commanding the 10th Armoured Division, to back him up. In a heated telephone conversation with Montgomery, Gatehouse said that he concurred with Lumsden and that to advance through uncharted and uncleared minefields, covered by strong batteries of anti-tank guns, with the noise from the tanks making surprise impossible, would be disastrous. Montgomery modified the scope of the attack from six armoured regiments to one: the Staffordshire Yeomanry. It lost all but fifteen of its tanks and the operation ended where it had begun, on the wrong side of the Miteiriya Ridge having failed to break through with the armour.

The Allies were victorious at El Alamein but for Lumsden, his confrontation with Montgomery in the heat of battle proved ruinous. Lumsden was replaced by Horrocks, who had previously recommended Lumsden to Montgomery, while Gatehouse was also removed from command. On his return to London, on entering his club Lumsden was heard to comment, "I've just been sacked because there isn't room in the desert for two cads like Monty and me." After Lumsden's death in 1945 Montgomery, notoriously sensitive to criticism of his generalship, unjustly blamed the near failure of his attack on 24/25 October 1942 on Lumsden.

Lumsden was liked and respected by Winston Churchill. After his dismissal by Montgomery he was given command of VIII Corps in Britain in January 1943 and command of II Corps in July, before being sent to the Pacific as Winston Churchill's special military representative to United States Army General Douglas MacArthur.

Death in action
On 4 January 1945, Japanese kamikaze began a week-long assault on American naval forces transporting MacArthur's 6th Army to Lingayen Gulf, site of the upcoming landing on Luzon, the Philippines' most populous island. The escort carrier  was badly damaged and had to be scuttled, suffering 100 casualties. A destroyer and tanker were hit but survived. Two Japanese destroyers tried to attack a convoy near Manila Bay but were fought off. One, the destroyer Momi, was sunk. On 5 January kamikaze attacked Allied naval forces moving toward Lingayen Gulf.

On 6 January, the Allies suffered their heaviest loss in the Pacific since Guadalcanal when kamikaze mauled the U.S. 7th Fleet as it began bombarding the invasion beaches on Luzon and minesweeping Lingayen Gulf. Twenty-nine kamikaze hit 15 ships and Lumsden was killed by one while on the bridge of the battleship , becoming the most senior British Army combat casualty of the Second World War. Lumsden was the subject of obituaries in Time Magazine and in the Times.

References

Bibliography

External links
Biography of Lumsden
British Army Officers 1939−1945
Generals of World War II

|-

|-

|-

|-

|-

1897 births
1945 deaths
People from Santiago
British Army personnel of World War I
British Army generals of World War II
British Army personnel killed in World War II
Companions of the Order of the Bath
Companions of the Distinguished Service Order
Recipients of the Military Cross
People educated at Eton College
Graduates of the Royal Military Academy, Woolwich
Royal Horse Artillery officers
12th Royal Lancers officers
Graduates of the Staff College, Camberley
British Army lieutenant generals
Academics of the Staff College, Camberley